The Baku–Rostov highway bombing  was an incident which occurred near the village of Shaami-Yurt in Chechnya, on October 29, 1999. Two low-flying Russian aircraft carried out repeated rocket attacks on a large convoy of refugees trying to enter the Russian republic of Ingushetia through a supposed "safe exit" route. The attacks killed or injured scores of people.

Incident 
The incident took place after it was officially announced that the border between Chechnya and Ingushetia would re-open following a week's closure. However, the convoy of more than 1,000 vehicles heading to safety was not permitted to cross the border and ordered to turn back by an unidentified senior Russian military officer (the area was under responsibility of Gen. Vladimir Shamanov), and subsequently attacked on their way back to the besieged Chechen capital Grozny.

According to the Amnesty International report, "at the time of the Russian attacks there were no legitimate military targets in the area. Eyewitness accounts of this incident would seem to indicate that the Russian forces had deliberately targeted civilians and civilian objects, despite some of them being marked with the Red Cross emblem, in violation of international humanitarian law."

The victims included local International Red Cross and Red Crescent Movement workers, two killed Chechen journalists (including Ramzan Mezhidov), and numerous women and children, some of them reportedly burned alive while trapped in their vehicles. Russian authorities have at first officially denied responsibility, and the later military investigations were not meaningful.

Similar incidents 

A similar aerial attack on a large column of refugees fleeing Grozny fighting took place in August 1996. A number of other attacks on "humanitarian corridor" refugee convoys and foot columns were also reported later in 1999-2000, including a December 3 incident in which about 40 people were shot to death at a Russian police checkpoint. In 2008 a suspected mass grave of some 300 persons was uncovered near Grozny, likely containing remains of victims of an artillery attack on a "green corridor" in October 1999.

ECHR judgement 
On February 24, 2005, the European Court of Human Rights found Russia guilty of violation of the right to life and other human rights violations in the case of the attack on the "safe passage" convoy after a joint complaint was submitted to the Court by three various survivors in 2003, summing up the established facts in its verdict:

References

External links 
"Russia hits refugee convoy", BBC News, October 29, 1999.

1999 in Russia
Mass murder in Russia
Second Chechen War
Aerial bombing operations and battles
Mass murder in 1999
October 1999 events in Russia
War crimes of the Second Chechen War